Jessica Baker is an American attorney and politician serving as a member of the Florida House of Representatives for the 17th district. She assumed office on November 8, 2022.

Education 
Baker earned a Bachelor of Arts degree from Florida State University and a Juris Doctor from the Florida State University College of Law.

Career 
Baker worked as a lobbyist for Sachs Sax Caplan. She also served on the staff of Jacksonville Mayor Lenny Curry and works as a prosecutor in the Seventh Judicial Circuit Court of Florida. She was elected to the Florida House of Representatives in November 2022.

References 

Living people
Republican Party members of the Florida House of Representatives
Women state legislators in Florida
Florida State University alumni
Florida State University College of Law alumni
Florida lawyers
21st-century American politicians
21st-century American women politicians
Year of birth missing (living people)